M&O may refer to:

 Mobile and Ohio Railroad in the American South
 Managers' and Overlookers' Society, a former British trade union
 Mason and Oceana Railroad in Michigan 
 Short form for Management & Operation